USS Meredith (DD-434), a , was the second ship of the United States Navy to be named for Jonathan Meredith, a United States Marine Corps sergeant who served during the First Barbary War.

Meredith was laid down 1 June 1939 by Boston Naval Shipyard and launched 24 April 1940, sponsored by Miss Ethel Dixon Meredith. The ship was commissioned on  1 March 1941.

Service history

Atlantic
Following shakedown in Cuban waters, Meredith returned to Boston on 8 June 1941 and was assigned to Destroyer Division 22. Departing Boston on 6 July, she engaged in patrol duty, exercises, and flight operations along the southern coast until 20 September. From 28 September to 31 January 1942, Meredith was based at Hvalfjörður, Iceland, where she patrolled between Iceland and the Denmark Straits. On 17 October 1941, she rescued survivors of torpedoed British steamer Empire Wave.

Following the attack on Pearl Harbor, Meredith engaged in escort and antisubmarine patrol between Iceland and the Denmark Straits, until she departed Halfjordur late in January, escorting a convoy to Boston. She sailed from Boston for Norfolk, Virginia on 18 February 1942, screening the battleship , and there joined the aircraft carrier  in Task Force 18 (TF 18).

Pacific
The force left Norfolk 4 March on a mission as secret as it was important, passed through the Panama Canal, and reached San Diego on 21 March. Departing San Francisco on 2 April, the force rendezvoused with TF 16, 13 April and sailed for the famous Doolittle Raid on Tokyo. On 18 April, the United States Army bombers were launched for this first carrier-based attack on Japan, and Meredith made course for Hawaii, arriving 25 April.

Between 13 May and 21 June Meredith escorted fleet oilers bound for New Caledonia, patrolled off Bulari Passage (a break in the reefs on the approach to Nouméa, New Caledonia), and escorted  to Pearl Harbor. Following gunnery and tactical practice, Meredith departed Pearl Harbor on 15 August 1942 for Samoa, arriving Pago Pago 30 August. Meredith next escorted Transport Force 2 to the Solomon Islands with reinforcements landed on Guadalcanal 20 September, then sailed for patrol duty in the New Hebrides.

Two days later it was learned that a Japanese carrier task force was in the vicinity and all ships except Meredith and Vireo turned back. Despite the fact that Meredith was equipped only with surface-search and not air-search radar, Commander Hubbard decided to press on to deliver the critically needed aviation gas.

Meredith was sighted by a Japanese patrol plane on the morning of 15 October, and shortly after midday took aboard the 68-man crew of Vireo to depart the area at high speed. In the first three minutes of the attack, Meredith was struck by a bomb that exploded beneath her bridge, destroying all communications, steering control, and gun direction. A second bomb struck the forward port side, and a torpedo exploded below the ready ammunition locker, igniting the ship's pyrotechnics and setting fire to fuel oil leaking from her bunkers.

Meredith fought fiercely, and brought down three of her attackers, but she was struck by an estimated 14 bombs and seven torpedoes. Six members of Merediths crew managed to swim to Vireo, and were rescued by a naval PBY Catalina flying boat on 19 October.

Awards
Meredith received one battle star for World War II service.

References

External links
USS Meredith website at Destroyer History Foundation
Loss of Meredith at Destroyer History Foundation
USS Meredith at NavSource Naval History
USS Meredith at Haze Grey & Underway

 

Meredith (DD-434)
Ships built in Boston
Shipwrecks in the Solomon Sea
1940 ships
Meredith (DD-434)
Destroyers sunk by aircraft
Maritime incidents in October 1942
Ships sunk by Japanese aircraft